The 1882 Stanmore by-election was a by-election held on 12 July 1882 in the  electorate during the 8th New Zealand Parliament.

The by-election was caused by the election of the incumbent MP Walter Pilliet being voided on a petition on 20 February 1882.

The seat was retained by Pilliet.

Initially a 0 (zero) was mistaken for a 9 (nine) and the total for the Hon E. Richardson was wrong (336 not 345).

And the Waikato Times published a grossly erroneous poll result.

Results
The following table gives the election result:

References

By-elections in New Zealand
1882 elections in New Zealand
Politics of Christchurch